Malczewski (feminine: Malczewska, plural: Malczewscy) is a Polish locational surname, which originally meant a person from Malczew or Malczewo in Poland. Variants of the name include Malczewscy, Malchevski, Malchevsky. The name may refer to:

 Antoni Malczewski (1793–1826), Polish poet
  (1754–1819), Polish archbishops
 Jacek Malczewski (1854–1929), Polish painter
 Jakub Malczewski (born 1974), Polish alpine skier
 Rafał Malczewski (1892-1965), Polish painter, writer and mountaineer
 Rafał Skarbek-Malczewski (born 1982), Polish snowboarder

 Alexey Sergeevich Malchevsky (1915–1985), Soviet ornithologist, dean of biology at the Leningrad State University

See also
 Malchevskaya, Nyuksensky District, Vologda Oblast, Russia
 Malchevskaya, Tarnogsky District, Vologda Oblast, Russia

References

Polish-language surnames